Rail transport in Brazil began in the 19th century and there were many different railway companies.  The railways were nationalised under RFFSA (Rede Ferroviária Federal, Sociedade Anônima) in 1957.  Between 1999 and 2007, RFFSA was broken up and services are now operated by a variety of private and public operators, including América Latina Logística, Companhia Paulista de Trens Metropolitanos and SuperVia.

Most railways in Brazil are for freight transportation or urban passenger transportation. Only two inter-city passenger railways survive: the Carajás Railway (connecting Pará and Maranhão) and the Vitória to Minas Railway (connecting Espírito Santo and Minas Gerais).

Track gauge
The rail system in Brazil operates on three rail gauges:
 Broad gauge:   gauge
 Metre gauge:   gauge
 Standard gauge:   gauge:
 line 5 of the São Paulo Metro, so that it can use "off the shelf" equipment.
 Estrada de Ferro do Amapá in the middle of the Amazon Rainforest also used standard gauge.
 Dual gauge:   and  gauges (three rails) (1999 est.)
 Total:  ( electrified).

A 12 km section of the former  gauge Estrada de Ferro Oeste de Minas is retained as a heritage railway.
 Metros

Metros operating, and under construction:
 Belo Horizonte Metro
 Cariri Metro
 Federal District Metro
 Fortaleza Metro
 Sistema de Trens Urbanos de João Pessoa
 Maceió Metro (under construction)
 Natal Metro
 Porto Alegre Metro
 Recife Metro
 Rio de Janeiro Metro (Rio de Janeiro Metropolitan Area)
 Salvador Metro
 São Paulo Metro (São Paulo Metropolitan Area)
 Teresina Diesel Light Rail

Tramways

Steam-powered, horse-drawn and electric tramways operated in Brazil from 1859 until 1989, new systems were introduced in the 1980s and 90s in Rio de Janeiro and Campinas with no success, nevertheless, that may change soon as studies are being conducted to introduce tramway systems in Goiânia, and Curitiba now plans a light metro to replace bus rapid transit (BRT) in a major corridor, and in Cariri, the Cariri MetroTram that will run between Crato and Juazeiro do Norte is under construction.

Passenger Rail

Intercity trains 
Although Brazil has one of the largest rail networks, it lacks passenger transportation. Passenger trains were controlled by state-run companies until a mass privatisation occurred in 1996–1999. By then, most tracks and rolling stock were in a very poor condition and most trains would not run over 60 km/h even on broad gauge, forcing the now private-run railway companies to shut down almost every single regional and long-distance services in the entire country in the next 5 years.  The situation remains the same .

Brazil is densely populated on the coast and southeast regions, making passenger train operation highly feasible; some areas, like the area north and east of São Paulo, have an extremely high demand for passenger trains, with, for example, over 4 million inhabitants in the 150 km area north of Greater São Paulo and over 3 million inhabitants in the 450 km area between São Paulo and Rio that have absolutely no passenger rail transportation and rely on other transportation, like airplanes in the case of São Paulo - Rio de Janeiro air bridge, which is one of the busiest shuttle air routes in the world, with flights taking off every 10 minutes between both cities. And closer destinations (such as Greater Campinas, which have 3 million inhabitants and is just 90 km north of São Paulo) need to rely exclusively on intercity buses that are slow, have low capacity and are close to being completely saturated.

Currently the country's rail network is almost entirely used for heavy freight transport only, all of the electrification of routes which were used for intercity passenger trains in broad gauge lines in São Paulo (state) are completely dismantled, as well as most of the train stations that are now in ruins (some were refurbished and are used as museums, government facilities and other purposes). Much of the dual-track lines are also abandoned, with trains making use of only one track now, most of which are in a very basic state of maintenance, running at very slow speeds. The lines and branch lines which were used for passenger only, the current cargo companies had no interest in, and are now completely abandoned. Brazil today has only a few heritage railways and two long-distance trains operated by Vale on narrow gauge that are more of a tourist attraction because of the scenic journey than a transportation system, especially because of the slow operating speed (60 km/h maximum), making Brazil's land public transportation infrastructure one of the worst and slowest in the world.

Rapid-transit and commuter 
São Paulo and Rio de Janeiro both have extensive rapid transit and commuter train routes. Although there may be discussed that they are much less than it should be for cities with their proportions, both systems are almost fully electrified and mostly have modern air-conditioned EMUs. Both systems are in constant expansion, but São Paulo is growing much faster, with currently 6 projects of subway and commuter lines being applied (3 in construction and 3 in advanced planning).

Apart from the large systems in Rio and São Paulo, the further cities in Brazil with smaller commuter train systems include the Cariri region, João Pessoa, Maceió, Natal, and Teresina. The other Brazilian metro systems are the Belo Horizonte Metro, Federal District Metro, Fortaleza Metro, Porto Alegre Metro, Recife Metro and Salvador Metro.

Future developments 
In the light of the problems with the lack of intercity passenger rail transportation, there are many projects to reinstall fast passenger trains back to Brazil, although all of them are on halt due to the current political and financial crisis.

High-speed rail

In September 2008, Brazil's Transportation Ministry announced a high-speed train project for the world cup connecting São Paulo, Rio de Janeiro and Campinas. This would cost US$15 billion. These lines will use  standard gauge.

The current financial crisis has put this high-speed project on complete halt, and has no prediction on when it will be resumed.

Regional Trains in Sao Paulo 

In 2010, São Paulo state government showed off a project to build up 4 regional intercity trains routes connecting the area surrounding São Paulo with high population cities close by, which today rely exclusively on intercity buses that are almost completely saturated and running at absurdly short intervals at full capacity. The original plan was for construction to start 2013–2014, but the Brazilian financial crisis that it is suffering since 2015 has put all projects on standby, and the next prediction is for construction to start only by 2020.

International link 
On 23 August 2008, Argentina, Brazil, and Venezuela agreed to develop an electrified long-distance passenger railway link between these countries.  A minor hurdle is the use of both 50 Hz and 60 Hz railway electrification systems.  There is also a confusion of gauges (3 gauges of 1435mm, 1600mm and 1676mm) to overcome.

New freight line
A new metre gauge line from Maracaju via Cascavel to Paranaguá for agricultural products is proposed.

Ferrogrão railway
A new north-south (1600mm gauge) line is planned, known as EF-170 and separate from the rest of the network, between Sinop in Mato Grosso state and the inland port of Miritituba in Pará state on the River Tapajós, first phase 933km. The line is expected to be used primarily for moving export grain and soya products from Mato Grosso state, but it would also carry fertiliser, sugar, ethanol and petroleum products: this traffic is currently carried on the BR163 trunk road.

Railway links with adjacent countries

Heaviest trains
Brazil has some of the heaviest iron ore trains in the world, and these run on the metre gauge track of the EFVM railway, these trains are pulled by a fleet of specially built locomotives that utilize 4-axle trucks or two pairs of 2-axle trucks with span bolsters.  The first model of locomotive built specially for this duty was the DDM45, created by EMD in 1970.  83 examples were delivered to the EFVM.  Later, in the early 1990s the EFVM also ordered BB40-8M models from General Electric and continues to order further BB40-9W models, also from GE.

However, a major power shortage occurred in 2002 across the Brazilian narrow-gauge systems.  As new locomotives would be too expensive for many railways, or would take too long to be delivered for others, the solution was to buy second-hand standard gauge locomotives and fit them with new metre-gauge bogies.  The number of axles was increased due to limitations with tractive effort output from the smaller metre-gauge traction motors. The dual-truck axle conversion was fairly expensive, so not all railways could afford it; some, such as ALL (América Latina Logística) retained the original trucks, narrowing them to fit the new gauge and fitting smaller traction motors.  Additional issues arose with the extra axles, primarily due to the increased length of locomotives creating excessive drawbar swing, causing some derailments on tighter curves.

History

From the 1930s to the 1970s, the railways were the main way to transport agricultural product from the rural farms to the ports. However, the different gauges, owners and severed connections between multiple networks lead to the abandonment of much of the rail network, being replaced with highways.

Predecessors 
The first incentive to start building a rail network in Brazil occurred in 1828, when the then imperial government incentivized the building of all transport roads. The first significant try to build a railway was the founding on an Anglo-Brazilian company in Rio de Janeiro in 1832, which planned to connect the city of Porto Feliz to the port of Santos. The government, however, did not support the project and so it didn't progress any further.

Three years later, in 1835, the regent Diogo Antônio Feijó passed the Imperial Law n.º 101, which conceded privileges for 40 years to whoever built railways connecting Rio de Janeiro to the capitals of Minas Gerais, Rio Grande do Sul, and Bahia. Even with the incentives in place, no investor risked starting the project, as there wasn't any guarantee that this railway would be profitable. Some groups did study the possibility of building this railway and its profitability, including another group of English and Brazilian investors, but none of them actually started building the infrastructure.

On 26 July 1852, Law 641, which gave advantages like a 90-year guarantee of a 33 km exclusion zone, the right to desapropriate any land that was "in the way", and a tax break for the import of railway material. However, it also came with an 8% limit to all dividends. With a revision of interest rate from 5% to 12%, the interest in building railways in Brazil spiked across the world, mainly in England, which was the main force behind the early construction efforts.

First railways 

Some time before the enacting of Law 641, the banker Irineu Evangelista de Souza requested permission to build a railway connecting the Port of Mauá, in the Bay of Guanabara, to Raiz da Serra. This railway became effectively the first-ever Brazilian railway, being inaugurated on 30 April 1854, with only 14.5 km of track and 1,676m (5' 6") gauge. Irineu's company, Imperial Companhia de Navegação a Vapor - Estrada de Ferro Petrópolis ("Imperial Steam Navigation Company - Petropolis Railroad"), realized the first port-railway operation in Brazil, transporting cargo from the ship Praça XV to Raiz da Serra. The Estrada de Ferro Mauá had little value besides its political and symbolic values, however. Mauá directly and indirectly participated in the building of nine other railways in Brazil.

The first section of the Recife and São Francisco Railway Company, which had 31 km between Cinco Pontas in Recife and the vila do Cabo, opened to regular traffic on 8 February 1858.  This was the second-ever railway in Brazil, being managed by the first British company that settled in Brazil. The planned construction was only finished in 1862, due to delays caused by a variety of problems.

The first stretch of the Companhia Estrada de Ferro D. Pedro II ("Dom Pedro II Railroad Company") was opened on 29 March 1858, with the 47,21 km connection between the Estação da Corte and Queimados, in Rio de Janeiro. Later, with the proclamation of the republic, this railway was renamed the Estrada de Ferro Central do Brasil ("Central Brazil Railroad"), which was one of the main axis of connection between Rio de Janeiro and São Paulo in 1877, when the Estrada de Ferro Dom Pedro II connected to the Estrada de Ferro São Paulo.

In 1867, São Paulo Railway Ltd was founded: the first railway built in the state of São Paulo, connecting the Port of Santos with the coffee farms.

In late 1889, when the republic was proclaimed, there were 9,583 km of active railways in Brazil, which served 14 of the 20 provinces. The government of the republic decided to start a new plan to build railways across Brazil, but few new railways were actually built because of the government financial crisis.

Expansion 

In 1907, the process of leasing out the Brazilian rail network started, with a statement from then president Campos Sales: 

During the years of the Old Republic, there was significant expansion of the rail network, reaching 29.000 km of rails, versus the 9.538 km that existed during the imperial period. The biggest expansion occurred in the state of São Paulo, where at its peak there were 18 railways, the biggest being the E.F Sorocabana, with 2074 km, Mogiana, with 1954 km, the E.F Noroeste do Brasil, with 1539 km and the Cia. Paulista de Estradas de Ferro with 1536 km, and the São Paulo railway, which held the connection with the port of Santos. Together, they helped the growth of agriculture and industry in the state.

Besides the railways in São Paulo, other significant railways were founded in this age, like the Estrada de Ferro Vitória a Minas in 1903 and the Madeira-Mamoré railway in 1912

Electric locomotives, planned since 1922, were introduced in the 1930s, to substitute steam locomotives in some stretches of track. In 1938, diesel-electric locomotives started operating in Brazil, and continue to be the main locomotives in use to this day.

Starting with the first government of Getúlio Vargas, the development of highways was prioritized, putting others ways, which until then had played key roles in national planning in the background. At this time, the nationalization of the railways also started, mainly the ones controlled by overseas companies. However, the lack of planning and investment in the interwar period made railways fall into disrepair, and few new tracks were laid.

Nationalization era 

In the 50s, the government request a study into the state of the railways in Brazil, which as of 1956 represented 14% of the debt country-wide. On 30 September 1957, the Rede Ferroviária Federal S.A. (RFFSA) was created, uniting 22 railways. Its objective was to standardize the railways, reduce the debts and modernize the network.

In 1971, the government of the state of São Paulo founded the other great state-owned railway, the FEPASA, uniting five railways already owned by the state. In the start, it had almost 5000 km of track, covering almost all of the state of São Paulo.

With the objective to reduce the debt of the railways, the used track was cut down to 32.163 km in 1964, and in the following years many branchlines which were considered uneconomical were closed down.

With the economical and political crisis that were happening in Brazil in the '70s, the RFFSA lost most of its budget. During the '80s, a lot of the network fell into permanent disrepair, and the railways, which were the most efficient method of transport lost much of its market share. In the end of the '80s, the RFFSA's budget was only 19% of what it was in the end of the '70s.

Privatization era 

On 10 March 1992, the RFFSA entered Collor's de-nationalisation programme.

Due to the opening up of the economy, Brazil entering international markets and the need for better alternatives for cargo transport, the RFFSA was sold off to private companies in 1996, with FEPASA following up in 1997.

With the extinction of the RFFSA, most passenger lines were also extinct, with only the Trem de Prata, which connect Rio de Janeiro to São Paulo surviving for one more year, being extinct 1998.

Historic Tramways 

Brazil is the fifth-largest country in the world and had a hundred tram systems, almost as many as all the other Latin American countries combined. It had one of the world's first tramways: an 1859 system in Rio de Janeiro pre-dates street railway experiments in all European countries except France. Trams still operate in Rio today, over 150 years later. Brazil has one of the first steam-powered street railways and had the world's first steam locomotive designed specifically to work on the street. It had one of the world's first electric trams, Rio de Janeiro had electric streetcars before London, Paris, Rome, Madrid, Lisbon and any other city in Latin America. Niterói, Brazil, may have been the first place where the trams were successfully fed by storage batteries. Brazil had the largest collection of American streetcars built outside the United States, and had the world's largest foreign-owned street railway empire.

Five trams were still operating in 1989, the Santa Teresa and Corcovado lines in Rio de Janeiro; the Campos do Jordão line near São Paulo; the Itatinga line near Bertioga; and the tourist tram in Campinas. A sixth line, the Tirirical tram near São Luís, ceased operation in 1983 but may be reactivated.

Currently, there are vintage tramways operating in:

Campinas – Heritage Tram
Campos do Jordão – Interurban Tramway
Itatinga – Non-public Tramway
Rio de Janeiro – Santa Teresa Tram
Santos – Santos tramways, Heritage Tramway
Belém – Heritage Tramway

Historical Railway companies
Pre-1957 companies - this list is incomplete
 Estrada de Ferro Central do Brasil, nationalised 1957
 Estrada de Ferro Oeste de Minas, a part of this railway still operates as a heritage railway
 
 Estrada de Ferro Santos-Jundiaí, nationalised 1957 -  gauge
 
 São Paulo Railway, nationalised 1946, renamed Estrada de Ferro Santos-Jundiaí 1948

State ownership
 RFFSA (Rede Ferroviária Federal, Sociedade Anônima). Created in 1957 and dissolved between 1999 and 2007.

Locomotives

See also 
 Present day Brazilian railway companies
 Transport in Brazil

References